Steve Stoute (born June 26, 1970) is an American businessman and record executive. Stoute is the founder and CEO of the Translation, a marketing agency, and the author of The Tanning of America: How Hip-Hop Created a Culture That Rewrote the Rules of the New Economy. Previously, he worked in the music industry as an American record executive and artist manager.

In 2017, Stoute received $70 million from investors such as Alphabet Inc. and Andreessen Horowitz to launch UnitedMasters, a music venture.

In 2008 Stoute worked with Mary J. Blige to co-found the Foundation for the Advancement of Women Now (FFAWN).

Career

Music 
From 1990 to 1999, Stoute was an executive at several labels in the music industry. At Interscope Geffen A&M Records, Stoute served as President of the Urban Music division and executive vice president. Prior to joining Interscope, Stoute was president of Urban Music for Sony Music Entertainment, where he played a role in launching the music career of Will Smith. Stoute was the former manager to Nas, Trackmasters and Mary J. Blige.

In April 1999, Sean Combs, then known as Puff Daddy, barged into the offices of Stoute with several bodyguards, and struck Stoute over the head with a champagne bottle. In June 1999, Stoute sued Combs, resulting in a $500,000 out-of-court settlement from Combs. The disagreement was over Combs' demand that a version of a Nas video he appeared in not be aired.

Advertising 
In 2009 the American Advertising Federation inducted Stoute into their Advertising Hall of Achievement, the industry's premier award for outstanding advertising professionals age 40 and under. In 2010, Stoute was recognized as "Innovator of the Year" at the ADCOLOR awards ceremony, an initiative launched by the ADCOLOR Industry Coalition, to promote increased diversity in the advertising, marketing and media industries. In 2013, Stoute was named "Executive of the Year" by Ad Age, the leading publication for the advertising and marketing industries.

Entrepreneur 
In 2005, Stoute became the Managing Director and CEO of Carol's Daughter, a line of natural hair and body care products created by Lisa Price in Brooklyn, NY. He formed a board of investors including Jada Pinkett Smith and Will Smith, Jay-Z, Mary J. Blige, Jimmy Iovine, Tommy Mottola, and Thalía and a bevy of spokeswomen for the line include Mary J. Blige, Solange Knowles, Cassie Ventura, Selita Ebanks, Kim Fields, and Jada Pinkett Smith. The company grew and sought partnerships such as Disney's "The Princess & The Frog" via a collection of hair and body products for children and HSN via an exclusive fragrance launch with Mary J. Blige. He has appeared in the HBO series and book "The Black List Project," featuring interviews and portraits with leading African American figures on being Black in America.

Author 
Stoute released his first book The Tanning of America: How Hip-Hop Created a Culture That Rewrote the Rules of the New Economy in 2011 through Gotham Books. In the book, Stoute draws from his diverse background in the music industry and brand marketing to chronicle how an upstart art form – street poetry set to beats – came to define urban culture as the new embodiment of cool.

In February 2014, the book was made into a four-part VH1 Rock Doc, "The Tanning of America: One Nation Under Hip-Hop." In April 2014, the book was released as an audiobook narrated by Kerry Washington.

Stoute has been the keynote or featured speaker at many notable events including the International Consumer Electronics Show, the Sundance Film Festival, South by Southwest (SXSW), Fast Company Innovation Uncensored, and AAF's ADMERICA. He also appeared on the main stage at the Cannes Lions International Festival of Creativity with Sean Combs in 2013, and again with Kanye West and Venture Capitalist Ben Horowitz in 2014.

References 

American record producers
American music industry executives
Talent managers
African-American record producers
Living people
American advertising executives
1970 births
21st-century African-American people
20th-century African-American people